CRC may refer to:

Science and technology
 Carboniferous Rainforest Collapse, an event at the end of the  Carboniferous period
 Class-responsibility-collaboration card, used as a brainstorming tool in the design of object-oriented software
 Clinical research coordinator, responsible for conducting clinical trials
 Colorectal cancer, the development of cancer in the colon or rectum
 CRC Energy Efficiency Scheme, formerly the Carbon Reduction Commitment, a UK wide scheme designed to increase energy efficiency in large energy users
 CRC Handbook of Chemistry and Physics, a reference manual published by CRC Press
 Cyclic redundancy check, a type of hash function used to produce a checksum in order to detect errors in data storage or transmission

Organizations
 California Rehabilitation Center, a state prison in the United States Of America
 Canadian Red Cross
 Capital Research Center, an American conservative non-profit organization
 Central Revolutionary Committee (French: Comité révolutionnaire central), an extinct French political party
 Civilian Response Corps, deployable American federal civilian employees who provide reconstruction and stabilization assistance
 Commission for Rural Communities, a United Kingdom public body
 Committee on the Rights of the Child, which reports on implementation of the UN Convention on the Rights of the Child
 Convention on the Rights of the Child, of the United Nations
 Communications Research Centre Canada, an agency of Industry Canada
 Communist, Republican, and Citizen Group, a French parliamentary group
 Community Rehabilitation Company, a private-sector suppliers of offender rehabilitation services in England and Wales
 Constitutional Research Council, a Unionist, pro-Brexit funding organisation in Scotland and Northern Ireland
 Control and Reporting Centre, part of the Air Force control and reporting system in most NATO countries
 Civil Rights Congress, a United States civil rights organization from 1946 until 1956

Religion
 CRC Churches International, a Pentecostal Protestant Christian denomination located primarily in Australasia
 Central Rabbinical Congress, a Haredi group
 Chicago Rabbinical Council
 Christian Reformed Church (disambiguation)
 Christian Revival Church, a Charismatic, Pentecostal and holistic Evangelical movement group
 Ligue de la contre-réforme catholique

Education and research
 Cambridge Regional College, a further education college
 Center for Research and Communication, a Philippine think-tank that later became the University of Asia and the Pacific
 Cooperative Research Centre, a type of hybrid academic/industry research body existing in Australia
 Cosumnes River College, a two-year community college in Sacramento, California
 Crowley's Ridge College, a Christian college in Paragould, Arkansas
 Cyclotron Research Center and Cyclotron Resource Center, particle accelerator complex at the University of Louvain, Belgium
 Georgia Tech Campus Recreation Center, the Rec center at Georgia Tech

Companies
 California Resources Corporation, a petroleum and natural gas company
 Chicago Recording Company, a recording studio in Chicago
 China Record Corporation, a large record company, based in Beijing
 China Resources (operated CRC Supermarkets)
 China Resources Cement, a cement company parented by China Resources
 Columbia Record Club, a mail-order music club offered by Columbia Records
 CRC-Evans, a pipeline-construction company owned by Stanley Black & Decker
 CRC Health Group, provider of addiction treatment and educational programs for adults and youth
 CRC Industries, a worldwide manufacturer of specialist industrial chemicals
 CRC Press, publisher, originally the Chemical Rubber Company

Places
 Costa Rica (FIFA and IOC code)
 Camp Red Cloud, a US Army Camp in Uijeongbu, South Korea

Sports
 Canadian Rally Championship, a rally racing tournament
 Canadian Ringette Championships, a national ringette tournament
 Canadian Rugby Championship, a rugby union tournament
 Capablanca Random Chess, a 10x8 chess variant
 Collegiate Rugby Championship, a rugby sevens tournament

Other uses
 Canada Research Chair, Canadian university research professorships
 Costa Rican colón, the ISO 4217 currency of Costa Rica
 Crc (protein), catabolite repression control protein
 Criminal record check

See also
 Cross Racing Championship Extreme 2005 (CRC 2005), a car-racing game developed by Invictus Games